Debi Dutta better known by her stage name Kyra Dutt is an Indian actress and model who primarily appears in Hindi films. She was one of the models of the famous Kingfisher Calendar in 2013.

She made her debut in a small role beside Ranbir Kapoor in Rocket Singh: Salesman of the Year (2009) and appeared in a special song for the film Mere Brother Ki Dulhan (2011). Later she appeared as a female lead in the film Calendar Girls (2015).

She is quite popular in the Telugu audience for her song "Boochade Boochade", from the film Race Gurram.

Early life
Kyra Dutt was born in Kolkata. She did her schooling from La Martiniere Calcutta.

Career (2009-present)
Kyra has been featured in brands such as Kingfisher, Mercedes, Thums Up, Close-up, HCL Laptop, Wild Stone Deo etc.

Kyra appeared in a small role beside Ranbir Kapoor in Rocket Singh: Salesman of the Year (2009) and later appeared in several special songs in South Indian films. Then she appeared as a female lead in Calendar Girls (2015). Later she signed a contract with Balaji Telefilms, under which she appeared in XXX.

In 2016 she appeared in a T-Series single titled "Party Animals", which became quite popular.

In February 2017, due to the delay in releasing the film XXX she ended her contract with the Balaji Telefilms. Later she appeared in a short film titled Lonely Girl, which was aired directly on YouTube on 23 February 2017. Later in early June 2017, she signed to do a special appearance song in Puri Jagannadh's Paisa Vasool, a Telugu film, but ended up playing a role of ACP Kiranmai, who works as a bar dancer incognito

In the year 2018 she was signed as the cover for FFACE Fashion Calendar.

Filmography

Discography

Singles

References

External links

 
 

21st-century Indian actresses
Female models from Kolkata
Living people
Actresses from Kolkata
Actresses in Tamil cinema
Indian film actresses
Actresses in Hindi cinema
Actresses in Bengali cinema
Actresses in Telugu cinema
Year of birth missing (living people)